Marcos Antônio Pereira (born 2 April 1975) is a Brazilian retired footballer who played as a forward. After starting his career at Internacional de Limeira, he went on to play for several Belgian Pro League clubs, including K.V. Mechelen, K. Sint-Truidense V.V. and Royal Antwerp.

His son Andreas Pereira plays for Fulham, after stints at Flamengo, Manchester United, Lazio and Valencia.

References

External links
Sport.de profile 

1975 births
Living people
Brazilian footballers
Association football forwards
Associação Atlética Internacional (Limeira) players
K.V. Mechelen players
Lierse S.K. players
K. Patro Eisden Maasmechelen players
Sint-Truidense V.V. players
Royal Antwerp F.C. players
Lommel S.K. players
Belgian Pro League players
Brazilian expatriate footballers
Brazilian expatriate sportspeople in Belgium
Expatriate footballers in Belgium